Langham Island is a river island located in the Kankakee River, Kankakee County, Illinois, United States.

Plant life
The plant Iliamna remota is endemic only on Langham Island.

Notes

Landforms of Kankakee County, Illinois
River islands of Illinois